Tracy McMillan (born September 12, 1964) is an American author, television writer and self-proclaimed relationship expert.

Background
McMillan is known for the 2011 viral blog post "Why You're Not Married," which for two years was the most-viewed article on HuffPost. She also wrote a book based on it, Why You're Not Married... Yet (Ballantine, 2012). Her screenwriting credits include Mad Men, Necessary Roughness, Chase, Life on Mars, and The United States of Tara. She won the 2010 Writers Guild of America Awards for Dramatic Series for Mad Men, along with other writers of the series.

As a relationship expert, she's made numerous television and radio appearances, including as a matchmaker on the NBC dating reality show Ready for Love, as well as The Today Show, Katie, Bethenny, Dr. Drew's Lifechangers, and Oprah's Super Soul Sunday.

She is biracial and the daughter of an African-American father and White mother.

McMillan is the author of a memoir I Love You and I'm Leaving You Anyway (It! Books, 2010) and her debut novel, You'll Know It When You See It, published by Gallery in 2015. She lives in Los Angeles, and continues to write occasionally for the Huffington Post.

Works
 A, B, C... Manhattan (1997) 
 Journeyman  (2007)
 Life on Mars (2008-2009)
 The United States of Tara (2010)
 Mad Men (2010, Christmas Comes But Once a Year)
 Chase (2010)
 Necessary Roughness (2011)
 Runaways (2019) "Smoke and Mirrors"
 Family or Fiancé (2019-current) Season One - 24 episodes

Bibliography
 McMillan, Tracy. I Love You and I'm Leaving You Anyway: A Memoir, It Books, 2011. 
 McMillan, Tracy. Why You're Not Married . . . Yet: The Straight Talk You Need to Get the Relationship You Deserve, Ballantine Books, 2012.

References

External links
 

1964 births
American screenwriters
Living people
American television writers
American columnists
American self-help writers
Writers Guild of America Award winners
American women non-fiction writers
American women television writers
American women columnists
21st-century American women